The Stardust Best Drama Actress is an annual award chosen by the readers of Stardust magazine. The award honours a star that has made an impact with their acting in a film.

Here is a list of the Best Actress in a Drama award nominees and winners, and the films for which they won.

List of winners
2011 Aishwarya Rai for Guzaarish
Bipasha Basu for Lamhaa
Kajol for My Name Is Khan & We Are Family
Kareena Kapoor for We Are Family
Katrina Kaif for Raajneeti
2012 Vidya Balan for The Dirty Picture
Deepika Padukone for Aarakshan
Katrina Kaif for Zindagi Na Milegi Dobara
Kareena Kapoor for Bodyguard
Priyanka Chopra for 7 Khoon Maaf
Rani Mukerji for No One Killed Jessica
Vidya Balan for No One Killed Jessica
2013 Priyanka Chopra for Barfi! & Sridevi for English Vinglish
Deepika Padukone for Cocktail
Kareena Kapoor Khan for Heroine
2015 Priyanka Chopra for Mary Kom
Alia Bhatt for Highway
Madhuri Dixit for Dedh Ishqiya
Shraddha Kapoor for Haider

See also 
 Stardust Awards
 Bollywood
 Cinema of India

References

External links 

Stardust Awards
Awards for actresses